Punchbowl, Inc. is a social planning software developer based in Framingham, Massachusetts. The company runs Punchbowl.com, a web-based online invitations service and digital greeting cards site. The company was founded in 2006, received venture funding from a variety of sources, and launched its website in 2007. The service allows users to plan and organize parties and events, with features such as customizable online invitations and local vendor search. The site has received media attention from multiple outlets including The Wall Street Journal, The New York Times, and TechCrunch. In 2007 it was listed on PC Worlds "25 Web Sites to Watch", and in 2008, it received the Massachusetts Innovation & Technology Exchange (MITX) Award for Usability, and was an Honoree for a 2008 Webby Award. In 2010, Entrepreneur Magazine listed it as one of the "100 Most Brilliant Companies", and the site was also lauded in The Oprah Magazine and Women's Health. In 2014, Punchbowl was named the exclusive provider of online invitations for Disney Interactive. In 2015, the company was awarded another MITX Award for "Best UX" and unveiled the 2015 "Characters Kids Love" Collection, confirming collaborations with Nickelodeon, WWE, and Activision.

Company history
Punchbowl was founded by software and user interface experts Matt Douglas and Sean Conta, who previously worked together at Bose Corporation. Incorporated on April 11, 2006, the company officially launched on January 15, 2007, under the name MyPunchbowl.com as a free site for party planning.

The company was funded by Contour Venture Partners, Intel Capital, and eCoast Angels, receiving its seed round of funding on October 2, 2007, from lead investor Intel Capital. On September 16, 2008, Punchbowl announced its Series A round of funding in the amount of $2.1 million led by Contour Venture Partners.

Punchbowl has acquired three companies: "I’m In!" on November 17, 2009, Socializr, a Silicon Valley event management platform created by Friendster founder Jonathan Abrams, on November 12, 2010, and VidHug, a video technology company, on June 10, 2021.

In September 2010, the company announced that it had surpassed one million registered users and had acquired the Punchbowl.com domain. In September 2011, the company introduced a new product called Digital Greeting Cards which is a free eCards service.

In February 2014, Punchbowl was named the exclusive provider of online invitations for Disney Interactive. The Disney Collection features favorites such as Mickey Mouse, Minnie Mouse, Frozen, Encanto, Disney Princess characters, Disney Fairies characters, Toy Story, Cars, The Muppets, and many more.

In October 2014, Punchbowl unveiled a new user interface and launched the “Characters Kids Love” invitation collection which has grown to include collaborations with Disney, Nickelodeon, Sanrio, Hasbro, and more. The collection includes hundreds of branded invitations that feature iconic, beloved characters from Marvel, PAW Patrol, Peppa Pig, Barbie, Sesame Street, Hello Kitty, My Little Pony, Transformers, and others.

The company has licensed its technology to leading retail and media sites, including Oriental Trading Company, 1-800-FLOWERS, Lifetime, Cozi, and Premier Designs.

Launch of Memento.com 
On June 9, 2021, Punchbowl launched Memento.com—a platform to record, make, and preserve memories from the most meaningful life celebrations and milestones. Punchbowl acquired VidHug, Inc.—a privately held company known for its best-in-class video technology—which provided the foundation for Memento and the initial vision for the new platform. "We're excited to introduce the easiest way to make a group video," said Matt Douglas, CEO, Punchbowl. "With this new product, we now offer families everything they need to plan an important holiday or milestone event on Punchbowl; and to record, make, and preserve the memories of that occasion forever on Memento."

Memento by Punchbowl offers an easy way to record and organize media from a family's most important celebrations, holidays, and milestones; make personalized digital keepsakes; and preserve these important memories forever. This new platform places the Company at the center of the family milestones that matter. 

Memento helps subscribers: 

 Produce a professional-quality group video with one click 
 Record, organize, and edit video clips from friends and family 
 Select colors, background music, and introductory text
 Present the group video as a digital keepsake, surprise video gift, or virtual celebration
 Easily make memories for any occasion—Birthday, Anniversary, Graduation, Holidays & more

Awards

 MITX Innovation Award, Best UX, 2015
 MITX Innovation Award, Best Consumer Tech that Makes Life Easier, 2011
 Named one of the “100 Most Brilliant Companies” by Entrepreneur Magazine, 2010
 O: The Oprah Magazine’s “100 Things That Are Getting Better,” 2010
 Named one of the “100 Most Useful Sites on the Web” by Women's Health, 2008
 Massachusetts Innovation & Technology Exchange (MITX) Award for Usability, 2008
 Webby Award Honoree, Events, 2008
 PC World’s "25 Web Sites to Watch", 2007

References

External links
Official website

Online companies of the United States
Companies based in Framingham, Massachusetts
Software companies based in Massachusetts
Social planning websites
Privately held companies based in Massachusetts
Internet properties established in 2006
Software companies of the United States
2006 establishments in Massachusetts